The Cambodian ambassador to China is the official representative of the government of the Kingdom of Cambodia to the government of the People's Republic of China.

List of representatives

References 

|

China
Ambassadors of Cambodia to China
Cambodia